Mount Dietz is a mountain,  high, just north of the confluence of Souchez Glacier and Bartlett Glacier where it marks the southern limit of the Hays Mountains in the Queen Maud Mountains. It was mapped by the United States Geological Survey from surveys and U.S. Navy air photos, 1960–64, and was named by the Advisory Committee on Antarctic Names for Lieutenant D.L. Dietz, U.S. Navy, a pilot on photographic flights during Operation Deep Freeze 1964 and 1965.

References 

Mountains of the Ross Dependency
Amundsen Coast